Island Shangri-La, Hong Kong is a five-star luxury hotel of Shangri-La Hotels and Resorts. It is located in Admiralty, Hong Kong and is the sister hotel to the Kowloon Shangri-La in Tsim Sha Tsui East, Kowloon. It is housed in a 213-metre, 57-storey skyscraper opened on 1 March 1991.

History 
The Island Shangri-La, Hong Kong was opened on 1 March 1991 as part of Pacific Place, a complex of office towers, hotels and a shopping centre at 88 Queensway in Admiralty. The hotel was part of phase two out of three, the initial phase having opened in 1988, and the final third phase in 2004. It contains 557 guestrooms which start at US$606 per night, of which 34 are suites which start at US$1,041 per night., spread through the top half of the tallest tower of the complex, which is 213 metres tall. The hotel also contains eight restaurants, a business centre, a 24-hour health club, a 645-square-metre ballroom, and seven function rooms. The bottom half of the tower contains office space known as "Two Pacific Place".

Pacific Place contains two other luxury hotels: the JW Marriott Hotel Hong Kong and the Conrad Hong Kong. The complex is directly connected to Admiralty station, part of Hong Kong's Mass Transit Railway that opened in 1979.

Design and construction 

The hotel's interior was designed by Leese Robertson Freeman Designers. 771 Viennese chandeliers are used throughout the interior, while carpets are provided by Tai Ping, whose hand-knotted carpets are handwoven in independent factories in China and Nepal.

The proximity of the Hong Kong Park, covering 80,000 m² has meant that the hotel has become popular with leisure travellers who are able to jog there in the mornings, according to former VP and GM Wolfgang Krueger.

Features

Art Collection 
The Great Motherland of China, which contains 250 panels, is the centrepiece of the hotel's art collection. It scales an internal wall of over 16 stories and can only be seen by guests riding the elevator in the centre of the hotel. The hotel also holds over 900 artworks and hosts art fairs and auctions. It was created by 40 artists from Beijing over six months.

As well as auctions in its ballroom by the likes of Bonhams that focus on contemporary Asian art, the hotel was also selected as the venue for art entrepreneur Dong Myeong Kim's Bank Art Fair, which showcased over 100 emerging Korean artists on floors 41 and 42 as part of Art Basel Hong Kong from 23–26 May 2013.

Rooms and suites

The hotel has 523 standard rooms of 479 square feet, 17 executive suites at 880 square feet, 14 Harbour View Suites at 944 square feet, two speciality suites at 1,416 square feet and a Presidential Suite of 2,253 square feet. Each has floor to ceiling glass windows with views of either the Victoria Harbour, or Victoria Peak. The rooms are all scented with the hotel's own brand fragrance, which it has made available for sale.

Restaurants 

The hotel contains seven restaurants. Fine dining facilities includes the one-Michelin-starred Cantonese restaurant Summer Palace and the one-Michelin-starred French cuisine Restaurant Petrus, both of which received the recognition in the guide's inaugural 2021 Hong Kong and Macau edition.

Health Club 

Located on Level 8, the Health Club offers yoga and pilates circuit classes. Treatments include the signature Caviar Crystal Soothing Treatment, using the European approach of entrusting selected products such as jojoba, almond, peppermint and rosemary oil for spa treatments in order to be unobtrusive. The club contains five treatment rooms, two for women, two for couples and one for men.

References

External links

 

1991 establishments in Hong Kong
Admiralty, Hong Kong
Hotel buildings completed in 1991
Hotels established in 1991
Shangri-La Hotels and Resorts
Skyscraper hotels in Hong Kong